Blaw, BLAW, or Blaws may refer to:

People
 Blaw family, the original holders of the title Laird of Burnbrae
 Jacob B. Blaw, founder of Blaw, predecessor to Blaw-Knox
 Anne Blaws, wife of John Hartwell Cocke

Fictional characters
 Lillet Blaw, a character from GrimGrimoire
 Walter Blaws, a character from The Saga of Darren Shan; see List of The Saga of Darren Shan characters

Other uses
 Bachelor of Laws (B.Law, B.Laws, or, LL.B), an undergraduate university degree
 Bloomberg Law (BLAW), an online law research tool
 Blaw Collapsible Steel Centering Company, predecessor of Blaw-Knox

See also

 Blaw-Knox, a construction equipment manufacturer
 Blaw-Knox tower, a type of radio tower constructed by Blaw-Knox company

 Blau (disambiguation)

 Blauw (disambiguation)
 Blow (disambiguation)